The Estate Carolina Sugar Plantation near Coral Bay on Saint John, U.S. Virgin Islands is a historic sugar plantation and later rum distillery.

The sugar plantation for sugar cane growing and processing was in operation during the colonial Danish West Indies period.

It was listed on the U.S. National Register of Historic Places in 1976.  The listing included eight contributing sites on a  property.

History

The estate was in the 1730s owned by magistrate Johannes Sødtmann. Jis estate was the starting point of the successful 1733 slave insurrection on St. John which began on 23 November and carried almost the entire island of St. John.

Today
The plantation's ruins include:  
 sugar factory — built c.1725. 
 animal mill — built c.1725. 
 stone windmill tower — built in 1733.
 original distillery for bay rum production — built in  c.1900
 a later distillery with "1925" upon it
 other Estate Carolina buildings from c.1900, 1920, and 1945.

See also

References

Sugar plantations in Saint John, U.S. Virgin Islands
Plantations in the Danish West Indies
Distilleries on the National Register of Historic Places
Ruins
Commercial buildings completed in 1725
Agricultural buildings and structures on the National Register of Historic Places
Buildings and structures on the National Register of Historic Places in the United States Virgin Islands
1725 establishments in North America
1720s establishments in the Caribbean
1720s establishments in Denmark
18th century in the Danish West Indies